Peridiniales is an order of dinoflagellates. Below is a uncritical list of the families in Peridinales, but molecular phylogenetics circumscribe the group in a stricter sense.

 Amphilothaceae,
 Archaeosphaerodiniopsidaceae,
 Blastodiniaceae,
 Calciodinellaceae,
 Ceratiaceae,
 Cladopyxidaceae,
 Coccidinaceae,
 Crypthecodiniaceae,
 Dinosphaeraceae,
 Endodiniaceae,
 Glenodiniaceae,
 Glenodiniopsidaceae,
 Gonyaulacaceae,
 Haplozoonaceae,
 Heterodiniaceae,
 Heterocapsaceae syn. Heterocapsineae
 Heterodiniaceae,
 Kolkwitziellaceae,
 Kryptoperidiniaceae,
 Oodiniaceae,
 Oxytoxaceae,
 Paradiniaceae,
 Peridiniaceae,
 Podolampaceae,
 Podolampadaceae,
 Polykrikaceae,
 Pronoctilucaceae,
 Protoceratiaceae,
 Protoperidinaceae,
 Protoperidiniaceae,
 Ptychochscaceae,
 Pyrophacaceae,
 Syndiniaceae,
 Thecadiniaceae,
 Triadiniaceae

References

External links
Picture of a Peridiniale

Dinophyceae
Dinoflagellate orders